Velho is Portuguese for old, and may be a surname as well as part of a toponym. It may refer to:

People
 Álvaro Velho, Portuguese sailor or soldier
 Bartolomeu Velho (d. 1568), Portuguese cartographer and cosmographer
 Domingos Jorge Velho (1641–1705), Portuguese bandeirante
 Fernão Velho (14th century), Portuguese nobleman
 Gonçalo Velho Cabral (1400–1460), Portuguese monk
 Luiz Velho (born 1956), Brazilian mathematician
 Maria Velho da Costa (1938–2020), Portuguese writer
 Nuno Velho Cabral (15th Century), Portuguese nobleman
 Ricardo Velho (born 1998), Portuguese football player
 Soccor Velho (1983–2013), Indian football player

Places
 Velho River (São Paulo), Brazil